Latham Peak is an Antarctic peak projecting through the icecap  southeast of Cape Ann and  northwest of Mount Marr. It was discovered in January 1930 by the British Australian New Zealand Antarctic Research Expedition under Mawson, who named it for Rt. Hon. Sir John Greig Latham, Minister for External Affairs in the Australian Government, 1931–34, and later Chief Justice of Australia.

References

Mountains of Enderby Land